Violeta Szekely, née Beclea (born 26 March 1965, in Dolheștii Mari, Suceava County) is a Romanian former middle distance runner who competed mainly in the 1500 metres. She competed in two Olympic Games, in 1992 and 2000.

She was favored to win the 2000 Summer Olympics 1500 metres after a stellar season, but getting boxed in around the final curb would cost her the gold medal. She only got out about 80 metres from the end and while she made up considerable ground was unable to catch the ground lost while trapped inside to surprise winner Nouria Merah-Benida. She was also favored to win the 2001 World 1500 metre title after dominating the Golden League series, but was beaten out by bitter rival and teammate Gabriela Szabo. She did however win a share of the golden league jackspot, by winning all of her Golden league 1500 metre races this season.

Szekely retired after the 2002 season.

Doping 
Beclea tested positive for steroids in February 1995 and was subsequently handed a four-year ban from sports. She also lost the fourth place from the 1500 m at the 1995 IAAF World Indoor Championships.

Personal bests
 800 Metres – 1:58.57 (1998)
 1000 Metres – 2:36.74 (1989)
 1500 Metres – 3:58.29 (2000)
 One Mile – 4:21.69 (1993)
 2000 Metres – 5:48.8 (1998)
 3000 Metres – 8:47.3 (1998)

Major achievements

Other achievements:
 Tenth place in the 1500 m. at the 1991 IAAF World Championships
 Fourth place in 800 m. at the 1989 World Indoor Championships
 Fifth place in 3000 m. at the 1999 World Indoor Championships
 Fourth place in 1500 m. at the 1999 World Championships

References

External links
 
 

1965 births
Living people
Doping cases in athletics
People from Suceava County
Romanian female middle-distance runners
Romanian sportspeople in doping cases
Athletes (track and field) at the 1992 Summer Olympics
Athletes (track and field) at the 2000 Summer Olympics
Olympic athletes of Romania
Olympic silver medalists for Romania
World Athletics Championships medalists
Medalists at the 2000 Summer Olympics
Olympic silver medalists in athletics (track and field)
Goodwill Games medalists in athletics
IAAF Golden League winners
Competitors at the 2001 Goodwill Games
Goodwill Games gold medalists in athletics